Son Se-hwan (born July 29, 1995) is a South Korean football player.

Playing career
Son Se-hwan joined to Tokushima Vortis in 2014. On May 24, he debuted in J.League Cup (v Nagoya Grampus). In July 2016, he left the club.

References

External links

1995 births
Living people
Association football defenders
South Korean footballers
J1 League players
J2 League players
Tokushima Vortis players